Melrose Park is a Metra commuter railroad station in Melrose Park, Illinois, a western suburb of Chicago. It is served by the Union Pacific West Line. Trains go east to Ogilvie Transportation Center in Chicago and as far west as Elburn, Illinois. Travel time to Ogilvie is 23 to 29 minutes, depending on the train. , Melrose Park is the 196th busiest of the 236 non-downtown stations in the Metra system, with an average of 86 weekday boardings. Unless otherwise announced, inbound trains use the north platform and outbound trains use the south platform. The middle track does not have platform access.

As of December 5, 2022, Melrose Park is served by 38 trains (19 in each direction) on weekdays, by 10 trains (five in each direction) on Saturdays, and by nine trains (five inbound, four outbound) on Sundays and holidays.

Melrose Park was originally built by the Chicago and North Western Railway and acquired by Metra. The station is at Main Street and North 18th Avenue, in Melrose Park's business district. Pace suburban buses stop one block to the west, on Broadway Street, and one block to the north, on West Lake Street.

Bus connections
Pace
  303 Forest Park/Rosemont 
  309 Lake Street 
  313 St. Charles Road

Gallery

References

External links

Station from 19th Avenue from Google Maps Street View

Metra stations in Illinois
Former Chicago and North Western Railway stations
Station
Railway stations in Cook County, Illinois
1956 establishments in Illinois
Railway stations in the United States opened in 1956
Union Pacific West Line